The 2021 Music City Bowl was a college football bowl game played on December 30, 2021, with kickoff at 3:00 p.m. EST (2:00 p.m. local CST) and televised on ESPN. It was the 23rd edition of the Music City Bowl (after the 2020 edition was cancelled due to the COVID-19 pandemic), and was one of the 2021–22 bowl games concluding the 2021 FBS football season. Sponsored by translation and language services company TransPerfect, the game was officially known as the TransPerfect Music City Bowl.

Teams
The game was played between Tennessee from the Southeastern Conference (SEC) and Purdue from the Big Ten Conference. The game was the second meeting between the schools; the first was the 1979 Astro-Bluebonnet Bowl, which Purdue won by a score of 27–22.

Purdue Boilermakers

The Boilermakers entered the bowl with an 8–4 record (6–3 in conference), including an away upset win against No. 2 Iowa by seventeen points on October 16, and a home upset win against No. 3 Michigan State by 11 points. The Boilermakers finished in a three-way tie for second place of the Big Ten's West Division. This was Purdue's second Music City Bowl; their 2018 team lost that season's Music City Bowl to Auburn, 63–14. The Boilermakers had not made a bowl appearance since, but this was Purdue's 20th overall bowl game in program history.

Tennessee Volunteers

Tennessee entered the bowl with a 7–5 record (4–4 in conference), including an away upset win against No. 18 Kentucky by three points on November 6. The Volunteers finished in third place in the SEC's East Division. This was Tennessee's third Music City Bowl; they lost in 2010 to North Carolina, 27–30, but won in 2016 over Nebraska, 38–24. This was the 54th overall bowl game for the Volunteers program.

Game summary

Statistics
Team statistics
Individual statistics

References

External links
 Game statistics at statbroadcast.com

Music City Bowl
Music City Bowl
Purdue Boilermakers football bowl games
Tennessee Volunteers football bowl games
Music City Bowl
Music City Bowl